Giuseppe "Pino" Schifilliti (born 1938) is a former prominent member of the DeCavalcante crime family since the 1980s, heavily involved in labor racketeering and extortion activities.

Made by DeCavalcante 

Toward the mid 1970s, Giuseppe Schifilliti was inducted into the DeCavalcante crime family, under the leadership of Simone "Sam the Plumber" DeCavalcante and early underboss, Giovanni "John the Eagle" Riggi. By starting out as a soldier, Schifilliti was hired in the same "Laborers' International Union of North America" at Local 1030, where he used to extort and bribe union officials to influence the power of the DeCavalcante crime family in construction sites, throughout the 1970s, alongside Riggi, who was then seen as the new boss of the family.

Caporegime by Riggi 

During the early 1980s, Giovanni Riggi was in total charge of the DeCavalcante crime family, as he promoted Schifilliti to the rank of caporegime or Captain within the family. Operating out of the Elizabeth, New Jersey faction, Schifilliti became a top member of the family alongside Girolamo "Jimmy" Palermo and Stefano "Steve the Truck Driver" Vitabile, with labor and construction racketeering, extortion, illegal gambling, loansharking and money laundering as criminal activities. Schifilliti also reputedly went under the radar, and operated with huge muscle throughout the 1980s, and early 1990s without a single indictment.

LaRasso and D'Amato 

In 1989, Riggi and several others were tried for racketeering and extortion charges. There was also internal rivalry brought up between the Newark and Elizabeth factions of the family. In 1990, Riggi was convicted on the charges and he was sentenced to 15 years. To make sure everyone knew he still ran the family, he ordered Schifilliti and consigliere Stefano Vitabile, to organize the murder of former underboss, Louis "Fat Lou" LaRasso, who was reported missing in 1991, as well as the then-current acting boss, John "Johnny Boy" D'Amato, who was murdered in 1992. Schifilliti was reportedly involved in both cases, as he cooperated much with Vitabile and the imprisoned Riggi.

Indictments and trials 

In 2000, internal rivalry almost brought a new war to the streets of New Jersey, as prominent acting boss Vincent "Vinny Ocean" Palermo was eager to control the entire DeCavalcante crime family, as he organized the attempted murder of rival Charles "Big Ears" Majuri, but failed to kill him. Later, an indictment wave of a four-year-investigation put 50 members and associates of the DeCavalcante crime family on trial, including prominent members Schifilliti, Palermo, Stefano Vitabile, Girolamo Palermo and Philip "Phil" Abramo, with labor racketeering, loansharking, extortion, fraud, illegal gambling, murder and conspiracy to commit murder charges. As that wasn't enough, Vincent Palermo decided to turn state's evidence, as did capo Anthony Rotondo and soldier Anthony Capo, over the next year due to the indictments. Schifilliti was held against bail, and due to his age, put under house arrest and put on trial in late 2001, and 2002.

Current status 

Schifilliti was tried with Vitabile and Abramo on two counts of murder and two counts of conspiracy to commit murder. He was charged with the murders of Louis LaRasso and the murder of John D'Amato, including the attempted murder of Charles Majuri. Schifilliti was convicted of racketeering, loansharking and extortion in 2003, as well as being convicted along with Vitabile and Abramo on the murder and conspiracy charges from the 1990s in late 2005. In 2006, Schifilliti was sentenced to life imprisonment along with Vitabile and Abramo.

In September 2008, a federal appeals court reversed Schifilliti's racketeering conviction and ordered a new trial.

References

Further reading 

Smith, Greg B. Made Men: The True Rise-and-Fall Story of a New Jersey Mob Family. Berkley Books, 2003. 
Jacobs, James B. Busting the Mob: The United States Vs. Cosa Nostra. New York: NYU Press, 1994. 
Jacobs, James B., Coleen Friel and Robert Radick. Gotham Unbound: How New York City Was Liberated from the Grip of Organized Crime. New York: NYU Press, 1999. 
Goldstock, Ronald, Martin Marcus and II Thacher. Corruption and Racketeering in the New York City Construction Industry: Final Report of the New York State Organized Crime Task Force. New York: NYU Press, 1990. 
United States. Congress. Senate. Committee on the Judiciary. Organized Crime in America: Hearings Before the Committee on the Judiciary, United States Senate. Washington, D.C.: U.S. G.P.O., 1983.

External links 
IPSN.org 
Racketeering Convictions Rejected for 3 in Mob Case By JOHN ELIGON

 

1938 births
American gangsters of Italian descent
DeCavalcante crime family
People from Elizabeth, New Jersey
American people convicted of murder
Living people
People convicted of murder by the United States federal government